Boroondara was an electoral district of the Legislative Assembly in the Australian state of Victoria from 1877 to 1889 and 1904 to 1945. It included the eastern Melbourne suburbs of Kew, Camberwell and Hawthorn.

Members

A new district, Eastern Suburbs, was created in 1889 covering much of the same area as Boroondara.

Boroondara was re-created in 1904.

Election results

References

Former electoral districts of Victoria (Australia)
1877 establishments in Australia
1889 disestablishments in Australia
1904 establishments in Australia
1945 disestablishments in Australia